The 1972 Iowa Hawkeyes football team represented the University of Iowa in the 1972 Big Ten Conference football season. Led by second-year head coach Frank Lauterbur, the Hawkeyes compiled an overall record of 3–7–1 with a mark of 2–6–1 in conference play, placing eighth in the Big Ten. Iowa played home games in Kinnick Stadium, which was renamed for the 1939 Heisman Trophy-winner, Nile Kinnick. The stadium was called Iowa Stadium from its opening in 1929 through the 1971 season.

Schedule

Roster

Game summaries

at Ohio State

References

Iowa
Iowa Hawkeyes football seasons
Iowa Hawkeyes football